Bezdna (: Abyss) may refer to:

 Bezdna (Chuvashia), a tributary of the Sura
 Bezdna (Tatarstan), a tributary of the Volga
 former name of Antonovka, Spassky District, Republic of Tatarstan, Spassky District, Republic of Tatarstan

See also
 Bezdna Unrest, a protest by serfs in the Russian Empire centered on the village that is now Antonovka